Baltaşı is a village in the Erzincan District, Erzincan Province, Turkey. The village is populated by Kurds and had a population of 44 in 2021.

References 

Villages in Erzincan District
Kurdish settlements in Erzincan Province